Mona El Shazly is an Egyptian talk show host. She is known for her talk show Al Ashira Masa'an (10 O'Clock) where she discussed news of the day and interviewed Egyptian and foreign politicians and scientists.

Early life 
El Shazly graduated from high school in the United Arab Emirates, then studied MASS COM and Political Science at the American University in Cairo.

Career
El Shazly worked in Public Relations at the Arab Contractors Company.

She hosted several programs on the Saudi-owned Arab Radio and Television Network Channel. She also hosts her on program, Ma3kom Mona El Shazly, on the Egyptian TV channel CBC.

She has been at Dream 2 Channel, a popular independent Egyptian satellite channel, since 2006, hosting Al Ashira Masa'an. "By her own estimate, she is one of the highest paid hosts on Arabic satellite television," a report said.  Addressing "government pressure on journalists in Egypt[;] 'They don’t understand that a presenter is not a spokesperson for the government or the regime,' she said. 'I am not a spokesman. But you always have this problem.'"

Personal life
El Shazly is married to Samir Youssef. They have three daughters, including twins.

TV Programs

Al Ashira Masa'an
Some of the guests that have been featured on the show are:

Mohamed Elbaradei, former Director General of the International Atomic Energy Agency (IAEA) and Nobel Prize winner
Ahmed Zewail, scientist and Nobel Prize winner
Ahmed Ezz, Egyptian politician and business tycoon
Naseer Shamma, Arab Iraqi musician and oud player
Gamal El-Ghitani, author and magazine editor
Alaa Al Aswany, author and founder of the political movement Kefaya
Yusuf Al-Qaradawi, Muslim scholar and head of the International Union for Muslim Scholars
Amr Khaled, Islamic activist and founder of life makers and right start foundation 
Omar Khairat, musician
Talaat Sadat, former Egyptian politician and current political prisoner.
Ayman Nour, politician; chairman of the El Ghad party.
George W. Bush, U.S. president; during the ten-minute interview on May 13, 2008, they discussed Egyptian-American relations and the issues of Palestine and Iran.
Wael Ghonim, Google marketing executive and one of the organizers of the Jan25 movement in early 2011; an emotional interview after he had just been released from an 11-day secret detention; the dead were mourned and the movement given new life by the broadcast, which "undercut two weeks of relentless state propaganda" according to a report

References

Egyptian television presenters
Egyptian women television presenters
Living people
The American University in Cairo alumni
1973 births
Mass media people from Cairo